Miķeļbāka or Miķeļtornis is the tallest lighthouse in Latvia.

Etymology 
Legends date origins of the name to 1749, when Latvia was part of the Russian Empire and the coast was surveyed by Mikhail Ryabinin, a Russian midshipman, therefore the lighthouse later built was called Mikhailovsky mayak ( – 'Mikhail's lighthouse'). After a period, the name was Latvianised to "Miķeļbāka”. At  it is the tallest lighthouse tower in the Baltic States.

History 
An electric light source was installed and supplied with electricity from a power plant in a nearby building. In the early 20th century, cracks began to appear in the tower as still seen today.

World War I 
In 1915 the light source and the generator were transported to Russia. During Germany's occupation of Latvia, they installed an acetylene light source. During WWI, the lighthouse was shelled by artillery. The original lighthouse was patched up, but it had to be demolished in 1932.

Independent Latvia (1918–1940) 
In 1932, a temporary wooden tower, almost as high as the original, was built. The tower was finished in September 1934. The light source was a Swedish-made, acetylene device. Depending on the distance, the light was either green or white.

Soviet occupation (1940–1941; 1944–1990) 

In 1941, during its retreat, the Red Army blew up the wooden lighthouse to keep it out of German hands.

Present day 
The present-day Miķeļbāka lighthouse was built in 1957, documented in the sign above its front door.

See also

 List of lighthouses in Latvia

References

External links 

 Bakas 36
 Bakas

Lighthouses completed in 1884
Lighthouses completed in 1932
Lighthouses completed in 1946
Lighthouses completed in 1957
Resort architecture in Latvia
Lighthouses in Latvia